Peter Cornelius (1913–1970) was a German photographer and photojournalist.

Biography 
After World War II, Cornelius restarted his career in "reportage, landscape and sailing photography" in his hometown of Kiel. Beginning in 1956, he specialised in colour photography as one of the first color photographers in Germany. In 1960 he became known to a larger public through the special exhibition Magie der Farbe (Magic of Color) during the Photokina in Cologne. The other photographers exhibited were Walter Boje,  and Heinz Hajek‐Halke. His best known work is a 1961 collection of color photographs of Paris, titled Farbiges Paris.

Publications 

Farbiges Paris. Düsseldorf: Econ, 1961. With text by Jacques Prévert. 
Couleur de Paris. Lausanne: Edita, 1961. 
Paris in Colour. London: Thames & Hudson, 1962. 
Paris i färg. Stockholm: Nordisk Rotogravyr, 1962. 
 Magie der Farbenphotographie. Düsseldorf: Econ, 1961. 
 Magie de la photo en Couleur. Edita, Lausanne 1961 (french)
 Magic with the color camera. Thames & Hudson, London 1962 (English)
 Köln farbig photographiert. Cologne: Verkehrsamt der Stadt Köln (tourist office of Cologne), 1965. Photographs by Cornelius, Horst Baumann and Chargesheimer. Text in German, English, French, Portuguese, and Dutch.
 Farbenfrohes Kiel. Kiel: Mühlau, 1962. 
 Farbiges Kiel. Kiel Presseamt (public relations office of Kiel), 1967. 
 Olympia der Segler. Bielefeld: Delius Klasing, 1972. 
 "Faszination" sailing calendar,  Bielefeld: Delius Klasing, 1967–1971.

References

Further reading

Chardin, Virginie. Paris en couleurs: de 1907 à nos jours. Paris: Seuil, 2007.

External links 
 Official site of Peter Cornelius with photo galleries and biography. 

Photographers from Schleswig-Holstein
Photography in France
1913 births
1970 deaths
Artists from Kiel